Tripsacum laxum, the Guatemalan gamagrass, is a species of grass in the family Poaceae. It is a larger perennial bunchgrass of the Caribbean, Central America, such as in Nicaragua and Guatemala, and North America in southern Mexico.

References

External links
USDA - Tripsacum laxum
ITIS Standard Report Page: Tripsacum fasciculatum - Guatemalan gamagrass

laxum
Bunchgrasses of North America
Grasses of Mexico
Flora of the Caribbean
Flora of Central America
Flora of Guatemala
Flora of Nicaragua
Flora without expected TNC conservation status